"Dark Knight Court" is the sixteenth episode of the twenty-fourth season of the American animated television series The Simpsons, and the 524th episode overall. It originally aired on the Fox network in the United States on March 17, 2013. The episode is dedicated to the recently deceased Robert Reno, whose sisters Maggy Reno Hurchalla and Janet Reno appear in the episode.

Plot
While performing at an Easter celebration, the Springfield Elementary band members inadvertently launch hundreds of eggs from their instruments, ruining the townspeople's clothes and splattering the streets. Suspicion quickly falls on Bart, but he denies committing the prank. Lisa eventually decides that the best way to determine his guilt is to hold a trial, which is presided over by Janet Reno. The odds do not look good in Bart's favor, and he is close to being found guilty. Meanwhile, Mr. Burns rediscovers his love of superheroes after visiting Comic Book Guy's store, and he decides to become a superhero named Fruitbat Man. Smithers, fearful of Burns's safety, stages numerous crimes for his boss to thwart, using Homer, Lenny, Carl, the Crazy Cat Lady, and other citizens as patsies for supervillain identities.  Desperate to find someone to solve Bart's dilemma, Lisa tries to hire Burns, but he refuses. Smithers admits to Burns all his previous exploits were faked, and this was Burns' one chance to really help someone.

As Marge washes the town's clothes, she and Lisa notice that Groundskeeper Willie's kilt is stained with only one egg, which appears to have been crushed into it by hand. Realizing that Willie is the culprit, Lisa confronts him; he confesses to committing the prank due to his hatred of the Easter holiday  (as he is a Scottish Old Believer Presbyterian) and shreds the kilt to destroy the evidence. As he tries to escape on his tractor, Burns intervenes and captures him, having had a change of heart. Burns turns Willie over to the court just before Reno can deliver a guilty verdict against Bart. Lisa thanks Burns and suggests that he might take advantage of his heroics to become a better person; meanwhile, Moe breaks down sobbing after he gets a phone call informing him of Bart's acquittal.

Before the end credits, there is a trailer for the "Dependables," a spoof that casts several of Springfield's elderly residents as a superhero team.

Production
Although Janet Reno is given voice credit as herself, she only has a few short lines; her sister Maggy Reno Hurchalla largely voiced her due to Janet being diagnosed with Parkinson's disease in 1996, leaving Janet unable to speak long sentences and a hard time standing for extended periods, resulting in her having to sit down occasionally during her voice sessions.

The episode was given a In memoriam dedication at the end for Janet and Maggy's brother Robert Reno, who died eight months earlier along with a prologue stating that Janet and Maggy's proceeds from their voice over roles donated to The Innocence Project.

Reception

Ratings
The episode received a 2.2 in the 18-49 demographic and was watched by a total of 4.89 million viewers. This made it the second most watched show on Fox's Animation Domination line up that night.

Critical reception
Robert David Sullivan of The A.V. Club gave the episode a B, saying "Earlier this season, I wrote that Mr. Burns was getting tiresome as a character. So though 'Dark Knight Court' isn't necessarily the funniest episode of the season, it is one of the most pleasantly surprising." 

Rob H. Dawson of TV Equals said "The Simpsons is at its best when it doesn't stray too far from its roots as a take on the family sitcom, and the Batman parody in 'Dark Knight Court' just didn't hit that mark for me."

References

External links 
 
 "Dark Knight Court"  at theSimpsons.com

The Simpsons (season 24) episodes
2013 American television episodes
Easter television episodes